In chemistry, the Noyori asymmetric hydrogenation refers to methodology for enantioselective reduction of ketones and related functional groups. This methodology was introduced by Ryoji Noyori, who shared the Nobel Prize in Chemistry in 2001 for contributions to asymmetric hydrogenation.  These hydrogenations are used in the production of several drugs, such as the antibacterial levofloxin, the antibiotic carbapenem, and the antipsychotic agent BMS181100.

History
The stoichiometric asymmetric reduction of ketones has long been known, e.g., using boron hydrides.

The catalytic asymmetric hydrogenation of ketones was demonstrated with catalysts based on BINAP-Ru halides and carboxylates.

Even though the BINAP-Ru dihalide catalyst could reduce functionalized ketones, the hydrogenation of simple ketones remained an unsolved. This challenge was solved with precatalysts of the type RuCl2(diphosphane)(diamine). These catalysts preferentially reduce ketones and aldehydes, leaving olefins and many other substituents unaffected.

Mechanism

The BINAP-Ru-diamine dihalide precatalyst is converted to the catalysts by reaction of H2 in the presence of base:
RuCl2(BINAP)(diamine)  +  2 KOBu-t  +  2 H2  →  RuH2(BINAP)(diamine)  +  2 KCl  +  2 HOBu-t
The resulting catalysts have three kinds of ligands: 
hydrides, which transfer to the unsaturated substrate
diamines, which interact with substrate and with base activator by the second coordination sphere 
diphosphine, which confers asymmetry.

The Noyori-class of catalysts are often referred to as bifunctional catalysts to emphasize the fact that both the metal and the (amine) ligand are functional. The mechanism was long assumed to operate by a six membered pericyclic transition state/intermediate whereby the hydrido ruthenium hydride center (HRu-NH) interacts with the carbonyl substrate R2C=O. DFT and experimental studies have shown that this model is largely incorrect.  Instead, the amine backbone interacts strongly with the base activator, which often is used in large excess.

Substrate scope
The BINAP/diamine-Ru catalyst is effective for the asymmetric reduction of both functionalized and simple ketones, and BINAP/diamine-Ru catalyst can catalyze aromatic, heteroaromatic, and olefinic ketones enantioselectively. Better stereoselectivity is achieved when one substituent is larger than the other (see Flippin-Lodge angle).

Industrial applications
Noyori-inspired hydrogenation catalysts have been applied to the commercial synthesis of number of fine chemicals. (R)-1,2-Propandiol, precursor to the antibacterial levofloxacin, can be efficiently synthesized from hydroxyacetone using Noyori asymmetric hydrogenation: 
Newer routes focus on the hydrogenation of (R)-methyl lactate.

An antibiotic carbapenem is also prepared using Noyori asymmetric hydrogenation via (2S,3R)-methyl 2-(benzamidomethyl)-3-hydroxybutanoate, which is synthesized from racemic methyl 2-(benzamidomethyl)-3-oxobutanoate by dynamic kinetic resolution. 

An antipsychotic agent BMS 181100 is synthesized using BINAP/diamine-Ru catalyst.

See also
 Midland Alpine Borane Reduction
 Corey-Itsuno reduction
 MACHO catalyst

References

Organic reduction reactions
Chemical synthesis
Stereochemistry
Hydrogenation
Name reactions
Hydrogenation, Noyori